Squared deviations from the mean (SDM) result from squaring deviations. In probability theory and statistics, the definition of variance is either the expected value of the SDM (when considering a theoretical distribution) or its average value (for actual experimental data). Computations for analysis of variance involve the partitioning of a sum of SDM.

Background
An understanding of the computations involved is greatly enhanced by a study of the statistical value

 , where  is the expected value operator.

For a random variable  with mean  and variance ,

 

Therefore,

 

From the above, the following can be derived:

Sample variance 

The sum of squared deviations needed to calculate sample variance (before deciding whether to divide by n or n − 1) is most easily calculated as

 

From the two derived expectations above the expected value of this sum is

 

which implies

 

This effectively proves the use of the divisor n − 1 in the calculation of an unbiased sample estimate of σ2.

Partition — analysis of variance 

In the situation where data is available for k different treatment groups having size ni  where i varies from 1 to k, then it is assumed that the expected mean of each group is

 

and the variance of each treatment group is unchanged from the population variance .

Under the Null Hypothesis that the treatments have no effect, then each of the  will be zero.

It is now possible to calculate three sums of squares:

Individual

Treatments

Combination

Sums of squared deviations

 total squared deviations aka total sum of squares

 treatment squared deviations aka explained sum of squares

 residual squared deviations aka residual sum of squares

The constants (n − 1), (k − 1), and (n − k) are normally referred to as the number of degrees of freedom.

Example

In a very simple example, 5 observations arise from two treatments.  The first treatment gives three values 1, 2, and 3, and the second treatment gives two values 4, and 6.

Giving

 Total squared deviations = 66 − 51.2 = 14.8 with 4 degrees of freedom.
 Treatment squared deviations = 62 − 51.2 = 10.8 with 1 degree of freedom.
 Residual squared deviations = 66 − 62 = 4 with 3 degrees of freedom.

Two-way analysis of variance

See also
 Absolute deviation
 Algorithms for calculating variance
 Errors and residuals
 Least squares
 Mean squared error
 Residual sum of squares
 Root-mean-square deviation
 Variance decomposition

References

Statistical deviation and dispersion
Analysis of variance